Dodge Phoenix can refer to:
 Dodge Dart Phoenix, an automobile built by the Dodge division of the Chrysler Corporation from 1960 to 1961 in North America
 Dodge Phoenix, an automobile which was produced by Chrysler Australia from 1960 to 1973